Koonwarra was a railway station on the South Gippsland line, in South Gippsland, Victoria. The station was opened during the 1890s and operated until 1992, when the line to Barry Beach, servicing the oil fields in Bass Strait, was closed. The line was then dismantled and turned into the Great Southern Rail Trail.

Koonwarra became a no-one-in-charge station in 1974.

References

Disused railway stations in Victoria (Australia)
Transport in Gippsland (region)
Shire of South Gippsland